Crankworx is a global tour of mountain bike festivals that take place in Australia, New Zealand, Austria, and Canada. The final stop of the Crankworx World Tour is a 10 day festival in Whistler, British Columbia celebrating several gravity-fed disciplines within mountain biking. Each summer the Canadian stop otherwise known as Crankworx Whistler is hosted by Whistler-Blackcomb in Whistler, British Columbia at Whistler Mountain Bike Park.
 
Each festival hosts a number of established competition formats such as downhill mountain biking, Dual Slalom, pump track racing and Slopestyle. It is important to note that these competition formats are markedly different from cross-country touring-style cycling. 

Since its inception in 2004, Crankworx has become one of Whistler’s largest annual festivals. It has been called the Super Bowl of the sport, and is the biggest annual gathering of the mountain biking community.

Festival

A central aspect of Crankworx Whistler is a series of village-wide promotional displays and activities pertaining to extreme-style mountain biking.  Many events happen throughout the week including demonstrations of bicycle tricks, racing and other entertainment.  There is also a collection of manufacturers' booths, and the festival serves as a cycling industry gathering.  Prominent display-type advertising, for a very wide variety of products, is present throughout all events.  The festival has attracted major sponsors including CLIF Bar, Dose.ca, SRAM Corporation, Redbull and various other corporate entities.

Competitions

The tour includes three series events – the Crankworx Downhill World Tour, the Crankworx Pump Track World Tour and the Dual Speed & Style World Tour. Athletes accumulate points all season long en route to the coronation in Whistler, while taking on as many events as possible in an attempt to secure the toughest titles in mountain biking, the King and Queen of the Crankworx World Tour.

Results

2022 Results
(Crankworx BC, Whistler Bike Park)

2021 Results
(Crankworx BC, Silverstar Bike Park)

2019 Results

2018 Results

2017 Results

2016 Results

2015 Results

2014 Results

2013 Results

2012 Results

2011 Results

2010 Results

2009 Results

2008 Results

2007 Results

2006 Results

2005 Results

2004 Results

References

External links
 Official Crankworx website

Mountain biking events in Canada
Mountain biking in British Columbia
Festivals in Whistler, British Columbia